The City of Albany is a local government area in the Great Southern region of Western Australia, about  south-southeast of Perth, the capital of Western Australia. The City of Albany had a population of over 36,000 at the 2016 census.

History

The Municipality of Albany was gazetted in 1871. It was initially headed by a chairman, with William Finlay becoming the first mayor in 1885.

The Albany Road Board  was gazetted in 1896. On 1 July 1961, they became respectively the Town of Albany and Shire of Albany councils following changes to the Local Government Act.

The City of Albany was established on 1 July 1998 with the amalgamation of the Town of Albany and the Shire of Albany.

On 1 July 1998, the two councils amalgamated to form the City of Albany.

A new administration building and Civic Centre was constructed and opened in 2005 on North Road.

Mayors
See also List of mayors of Albany, Western Australia

Alison Goode was mayor from 1999 until 2007.

Milton Evans was elected mayor in 2007 and served until elections in 2011 when he was defeated by Dennis Wellington.

Dennis Wellington is the current mayor, elected for a second time in 2015 and again re-elected in 2019 and still serving as mayor in 2022.

Wards
The city has been divided into six  wards, each of two councillors. Each councillor serves a four-year term, and half-elections are held every two years. The mayor is directly elected.

Breaksea
Frederickstown (central Albany)
Kalgan
Vancouver
West
Yakamia

Towns, suburbs and localities
The towns, suburbs and localities of the City of Albany with population and size figures based on the most recent Australian census:

  For the purpose of the 2021 Australian census, Frenchman Bay was counted as part of Torndirrup.

Heritage-listed places

As of 2023, 471 places are heritage-listed in the City of Albany, of which 95 are on the State Register of Heritage Places.

National Parks and Reserves
 Bakers Junction Nature Reserve
 Bald Island Nature Reserve
 Gull Rock National Park
 Mill Brook Nature Reserve
 North and South Sister Nature Reserves
 Tinkelelup Nature Reserve
 Torndirrup National Park
 Two Peoples Bay Nature Reserve
 Waychinicup National Park
 West Cape Howe National Park

References

External links
 

Albany
Albany, Western Australia
City of Albany, Western Australia